Mt. Carmel Methodist Church is a historic church in rural Dallas County, Arkansas, near the hamlet of Jacinto.  It is located northwest of the county seat Fordyce, on County Road 113 just east of Arkansas Highway 9.  It is set in a clearing near several other small frame churches.   It is also a frame structure, built c. 1900, that is set apart from other rural churches in the county by its use of Gothic Revival pointed-arch windows.  These windows are topped by slightly projecting triangular hoods, heightening the prominence of the Gothic points and relieving the otherwise plain side facades.

The building was listed on the National Register of Historic Places in 1983.

See also
National Register of Historic Places listings in Dallas County, Arkansas

References

Methodist churches in Arkansas
Churches on the National Register of Historic Places in Arkansas
Greek Revival church buildings in Arkansas
Churches completed in 1900
Churches in Dallas County, Arkansas
National Register of Historic Places in Dallas County, Arkansas